Opus Jay World Tour is the fifth live album by Taiwanese singer Jay Chou, released on 10 May 2016 by JVR Music and included a date filmed at Taipei Arena on 6 September 2013 from the Opus Jay World Tour.

Track listing
DVD
 "Opening"
 "Exclamation Point" (驚嘆號)
 "Dragon Fist" (龍拳)
 "The Final Battle" (最後的戰役)
 "The Rooftop" (天台) feat. Devon Song
 "A Larger Cello" (比較大的大提琴) feat. Cindy Yen, Gary Yang, Devon Song & Darren Chiu
 "Slow Dance" (快門慢舞) feat. Cindy Yen & Darren Chiu
 "Fight Dance" (打架舞) feat. Devon Song & Darren Chiu
 "You are Everywhere" (哪裡都是你)
 "All the Way North" (一路向北)
 "Secret That Can't Be Told" (不能說的秘密)
 "Nunchucks" (雙截棍)
 "Obviously" (明明就)
 "Mine Mine"
 "Tornado" (龍捲風)
 "Eunuch With a Headache" (公公偏頭痛)
 "Blue and White Porcelain" (青花瓷)
 "Basketball Match" (鬥牛) / "Sailor Afraid of Water" (水手怕水) / "Big Ben" (大笨鐘)
 "Rainbow" (彩虹) / "Orbit" (軌跡)
 "Sign Language" (手語)
 "I Find it Hard to Say" (開不了口)
 "Ukulele" (烏克麗麗)
 "Sunshine Homeboy" (陽光宅男) feat. Cindy Yen, Gary Yang, Devon Song & Darren Chiu
CD 1
 "Exclamation Point" (驚嘆號)
 "Dragon Fist" (龍拳)
 "The Final Battle" (最後的戰役)
 "The Rooftop" (天台) feat. Devon Song
 "A Larger Cello" (比較大的大提琴) feat. Cindy Yen, Gary Yang, Devon Song & Darren Chiu
 "Slow Dance" (快門慢舞) feat. Cindy Yen & Darren Chiu
 "Fight Dance" (打架舞) feat. Devon Song & Darren Chiu
 "You are Everywhere" (哪裡都是你)
 "All the Way North" (一路向北)
 "Secret That Can't Be Told" (不能說的秘密)
 "Nunchucks" (雙截棍)
CD 2
 "Obviously" (明明就)
 "Mine Mine"
 "Tornado" (龍捲風)
 "Eunuch with a Headache" (公公偏頭痛)
 "Blue and White Porcelain" (青花瓷)
 "Basketball Match" (鬥牛) / "Sailor Afraid of Water" (水手怕水) / "Big Ben" (大笨鐘)
 "Rainbow" (彩虹) / "Orbit" (軌跡)
 "Sign Language" (手語)
 "I Find it Hard to Say" (開不了口)
 "Ukulele" (烏克麗麗)
 "Sunshine Homeboy" (陽光宅男) feat. Cindy Yen, Gary Yang, Devon Song & Darren Chiu

References

External links
  Jay Chou discography@JVR Music

2013 live albums
Albums recorded at the Taipei Arena
Jay Chou albums
Sony Music Taiwan albums